Herrin Peak is a large snow-covered peak,  high, standing  south of Landmark Peak on the east side of Gowan Glacier, in the Heritage Range of Antarctica. It was named by the University of Minnesota Geological Party of 1963–64 for John M. Herrin, a helicopter crew chief with the 62nd Transportation Detachment, who assisted the party.

See also
 Mountains in Antarctica

References

Mountains of Ellsworth Land